Thruster Air Services was a British aircraft manufacturer based in Langworth, Lincolnshire. The company specialized in the design and manufacture of ultralight aircraft in the form of ready-to-fly aircraft for the Fédération Aéronautique Internationale microlight category.

History
The company was formed in Camelford, Cornwall, in the mid-1980s to produce the Thruster TST and the Thruster T300. By the mid-1990s the company was producing the T600 and it continued to be developed over time. In the winter of 2006 the company was sold to Stephen Turley and Gerald Cooper and in the summer of 2007 was moved to Wickenby Aerodrome in Lincolnshire.

As of July 2021 the company is listed as "dormant", the company website domain is for sale and no information is readily available for the status of this company.

Aircraft

References

External links

Aircraft manufacturers of the United Kingdom
Companies based in Lincolnshire
Homebuilt aircraft
Ultralight aircraft
West Lindsey District